A partial solar eclipse occurred on November 20, 1873 during spring.  A solar eclipse occurs when the Moon passes between Earth and the Sun, thereby totally or partly obscuring the image of the Sun for a viewer on Earth. A partial solar eclipse occurs in the polar regions of the Earth when the center of the Moon's shadow misses the Earth.

It was the last of two all partial eclipses that took place that year.  It was part of  solar saros 150.

The next eclipse was on April 16, 1874 in the same hemisphere, it covered the smaller part of the area of the previous eclipse including the northernmost of Antarctica along with Prime Meridian, the ice shelf with the island would be inside the umbral portion which was a total eclipse.

Description
The eclipse took place in almost the whole of Antarctica (much of it in areas that had a 24-hour daylight at the time) except for areas within the separation of the Indian and Pacific Ocean and the northernmost of its peninsula with its islands which was nighttime, it also occurred largely in the Atlantic and Indian Ocean along with Prince Edward and Kerguelen Islands.  The rim of the eclipse included modern-day South Africa and the south of Madagascar, the eclipse was close to Maputo (then Lourenço Marques), Mozambique.

The eclipse went as far as hundreds of miles (or kilometers) south of East London, South Africa and around the same parallel with Cape Town. The eclipse started at sunrise in the Indian Ocean and ended at sunset in Antarctica.  A very small part occurred on the location of the previous eclipse, many areas occurred on the opposite side.

As the moon moved towards the left on Earth in Africa, at the peninsular portion, in Northern and Peninsular Antarctica, it was seen as it was moved towards the bottom right, then right then top as the axis spun at around the 70th parallel south.

The center of the Moon's shadow was missed by about 1,300 km above the area (69 S) south of the Antarctic Circle.

The eclipse began at sunrise southeast of Madagascar and ended at sunset in the southern part of the Pacific Ocean. The greatest eclipse was in the Atlantic off the shore of Antarctica at 63.2 S & 9.5 W at 3:22  UTC and occurred after sunrise.

It showed up to 25% obscuration of the sun at the middle of the Antarctic Peninsula at the 110th meridian and around 30% in the area of the South Pole, at the northern shore by the 20th meridian, it was close to 50% obscured.
The subsolar marking was in Brazil.

See also 
 List of solar eclipses in the 19th century

References

External links 
 Google interactive maps
 Solar eclipse data

1873 11
Solar eclipse of 11 20
1873 11
November 1873 events